Mucun may refer to:

 Mucun, Shanxi (穆村镇), town in Liulin County
 Mucun Township, Shenzhou (穆村乡), Hebei
 Mucun Township, Xinle (木村乡), Hebei
 Mucun Township, Jiangxi (睦村乡), in Jinggangshan City

See also
 Guan Mucun